Pachylasma is a genus of symmetrical sessile barnacles in the family Pachylasmatidae. There are about eight described species in Pachylasma.

Species
These species belong to the genus Pachylasma:
 Pachylasma bacum Jones, 2000
 Pachylasma darwinianum Pilsbry, 1912
 Pachylasma ecaudatum Hiro, 1939
 Pachylasma giganteum (Philippi, 1836)
 Pachylasma integrirostrum Broch, 1931
 Pachylasma laeviscutum Jones, 2000
 Pachylasma ovatum Jones, 2000
 Pachylasma scutistriata Broch, 1922

References

External links

 

Barnacles